The Hungarian Company of the Lithuanian Grand Marshal was a military unit of the Grand Duchy of Lithuania.

History 
The company was formed in 1717. The Lithuanian Maršalka was the chef of the infantry company, which was always present wherever he was. It was disbanded in 1794.

Commanders

Bibliography

Citations

References 

Grand Duchy of Lithuania
Military units and formations established in 1717